Ropesville is a city in Hockley County, Texas, United States. Its population was 434 at the 2010 census, down from 517 at the 2000 census.

Geography

Ropesville is located on the high plains of the Llano Estacado at  (33.4134229, –102.1543406), in the southeast corner of Hockley County. U.S. Routes 62 and 82 pass together through the northwest side of the city, leading northeast  to Lubbock and southwest  to Brownfield.

Demographics

As of the census of 2000,  517 people, 177 households, and 141 families resided in the city. The 185 housing units averaged . The racial makeup of the city was 87.43% White, 2.13% African American, 0.97% Native American, 6.00% from other races, and 3.48% from two or more races. Hispanics or Latinos of any race were 53.19% of the population.

Of the 177 households, 43.5% had children under the age of 18 living with them, 64.4% were married couples living together, 7.9% had a female householder with no husband present, and 19.8% were not families. About 18.6% of all households were made up of individuals, and 9.6% had someone living alone who was 65 years of age or older. The average household size was 2.92 and the average family size was 3.32.

In the city, the population was distributed as 33.3% under the age of 18, 8.1% from 18 to 24, 26.1% from 25 to 44, 20.9% from 45 to 64, and 11.6% who were 65 years of age or older. The median age was 33 years. For every 100 females, there were 101.2 males. For every 100 females age 18 and over, there were 96.0 males.

The median income for a household in the city was $29,531, and for a family was $31,250. Males had a median income of $21,176 versus $18,393 for females. The per capita income for the city was $16,670. About 14.7% of families and 14.6% of the population were below the poverty line, including 19.2% of those under age 18 and 16.4% of those age 65 or over.

Education
Ropesville is served by the Ropes Independent School District.

Government
The city government is presided over by Mayor Brenda Rabel.

References

External links
Handbook of Texas: Ropesville, TX
Photos of the Llano Estacado

Cities in Hockley County, Texas
Cities in Texas